Raymond Dugrand (13 January 1925 – 13 February 2017) was a French geographer and urban planner. He was a professor of geography at the University of Montpellier, and the author of several books about the geography of the Languedoc. He was the head of urban planning for the city of Montpellier from 1977 to 2001. He is the namesake of an avenue in Montpellier.

Early life
Raymond Dugrand was born on 13 January 1925. He joined the French Resistance in Haute-Vienne in 1943, in the midst of World War II. He joined the French Communist Party in 1945, but later became an "anti-communist". Meanwhile, he joined an underground network of activists who hid people sentenced to the death penalty.

Dugrand attended a teachers college in Châteauroux until 1945, when he enrolled at the University of Paris to study geography. He earned the agrégation in geography, followed by a doctorate in geography. His thesis supervisor was Pierre George.

Career
Dugrand became a faculty member at the University of Montpellier, later known as Paul Valéry University, in 1963. He was the author of three books and the co-author of two more books on the geography of the Languedoc. He also served on the editorial board of the L’Espace géographique, an academic journal.

Upon Georges Frêche's election as the mayor of Montpellier in 1977, Dugrand became the head of urban planning for the city. He served in this capacity until 2001. During his tenure, he hired Spanish architect Ricardo Bofill to design the Antigone neighbourhood of Montpellier. He also hired architects Paul Chemetov, Robert Croizet, François Fontès, Massimiliano Fuksas, Rob Krier, Emmanuel Nebout, Jean Nouvel, Christian de Portzamparc and Jean-Michel Wilmotte to design other buildings in Montpellier.

The Avenue Raymond Dugrand in Montpellier was named in his honour in 2009.

Death
Dugrand died on 13 February 2017 in Montpellier, at the age of 92.

Works

References

1925 births
2017 deaths
University of Paris alumni
French Resistance members
French geographers
French urban planners
Academic staff of the University of Montpellier
French Communist Party members
20th-century geographers
21st-century geographers